Blera is primarily a North American genus, though there are 3 species from Europe.
The genus is characterized by the following characters: 
face with distinct central knob, less developed in females; frons distinctly produced
antennae shorter then head width, arista dorsal
body covered long sometimes dense hairs
legs simple bare and undeveloped metasternite
short apical section of vein R 4+5 

The larvae are found in decaying heartwood in roots of trees and stumps.

There are keys to American and British species. 
external map

Species

Blera ambigua (Shiraki, 1968)
Blera analis (Macquart, 1842)
Blera armillata (Osten Sacken, 1875)
Blera badia (Walker, 1849)
Blera chillcotti Thompson, 2012
Blera confusa Johnson, 1913
Blera eoa (Stackelberg, 1928)
Blera equimacula Huo, Ren & Zheng, 2007
Blera fallax (Linnaeus, 1758)
Blera ferdinandi (Hervé-Bazin, 1914)
Blera flukei (Curran, 1953)
Blera garretti (Curran, 1924)
Blera himalaya Thompson, 2000
Blera humeralis (Williston, 1882)
Blera japonica (Shiraki, 1930)
Blera johnsoni (Coquillett, 1894)
Blera kyotoensis (Shiraki, 1952)
Blera lonigseta Barkalov & Cheng, 2011
Blera metcalfi <small>(Curran, 1925) 
Blera nigra (Williston, 1887)
Blera nigrescens Shiraki, 1968
Blera nigripes (Curran, 1925)
Blera nitens (Stackelberg, 1923)
Blera notata (Wiedemann, 1830)
Blera ochrozona (Stackelberg, 1928)
Blera pictipes (Bigot, 1884)
Blera robusta (Curran, 1922)
Blera scitula (Williston, 1887)
Blera shirakii Barkalov & Mutin, 1991
Blera umbratilis (Williston, 1887)
Blera violovitshi Mutin, 1991
Blera yudini Barkalov, 1991

References

Hoverfly genera
Eristalinae
Taxa named by Gustaf Johan Billberg
Diptera of Asia
Diptera of Europe
Diptera of North America
Diptera of South America